Gametis jucunda, the smaller green flower chafer, is a species of flower chafer found in Japan. It has been known to damage citrus and other plants.

References 

Cetoniinae
Beetles of Asia
Insects of Japan
Beetles described in 1835